The Speed of the Old Long Bow (or more completely The Speed of the Old Long Bow: A Tribute to Ed Haley) is an album by John Hartford of traditional American fiddle music, released in 1998.  It is a tribute to the legendary Kentucky/West Virginia old-time fiddler Blind Ed Haley.

Reception

In his review for AllMusic, critic Steve Leggett wrote "Hartford quite wisely doesn't try to replicate Haley's takes (Hartford admits in the liner notes that he doesn't play like Haley, but that he enjoys trying), but instead interprets them, and the result is pure loose-jointed fun. Everything here is like a patch in a quilt, and the trademark Hartford wit, joy and energy is everywhere apparent. Highlights include the set opener, "Hell Up Coal Holler," "Bonaparte's Retreat" (which is practically the fiddler's national anthem), and a pair of vocal excursions, "Cattlettsburg" and "Boatmen." Although Long Bow is very much a tribute to Ed Haley, it is also very much a John Hartford album, and Hartford's fans will surely treasure it."

Track listing
All songs written or arranged by Ed Haley.
 "Hell up Coal Holler" – 3:13
 "Yellow Barber" – 3:02
 "Lost Indian" – 4:44
 "Dunbar" –  4:42
 "Brushy Fork of John's Creek" – 3:15
 "Bonaparte's Retreat" – 4:50
 "Forks of Sandy" – 3:49
 "Cattlettsburg" – 4:03
 "Half Past Four" – 4:36
 "Blackberry Blossom" – 2:42
 "Pumpkin Ridge" – 4:19
 "Brownlow's Dream" – 4:24
 "Rebel Raid" – 3:58
 "Boatman" – 3:38
 "Ida Red" – 2:38

Personnel
John Hartford – fiddle, vocals
Bob Carlin – banjo
Mike Compton – mandolin
Rob Gateley – string bass
Darrin Vincent – guitar, percussion

Production notes
Bob Carlin – producer, mixing
Mark Howard – engineer
Wes Lachot – engineer, mixing
John Hartford – art direction, liner notes
Luanne Price Howard – art direction
Brandon Kirk – research, liner notes
Billy Adkins – research

References

John Hartford albums
1998 albums